Events in the year 1928 in Belgium.

Incumbents
Monarch – Albert I
Prime Minister – Henri Jaspar

Events
 19 January – Wireless telegraph between Brussels and New York comes into service.
 1 March – First Belgian newspaper published in Elisabethville, Belgian Congo (now Lubumbashi).
 27 April – First board meeting of the newly established National Fund for Scientific Research, chaired by Émile Francqui.
 13 May – The 1928 Liège–Bastogne–Liège cycle race is won by Belgian rider Ernest Mottard.
 June – The Belgian Open golf tournament is played at the Royal Golf Club of Belgium and is won by Albert Tingey Jr.
 4 July – Financier Alfred Loewenstein vanishes on a Croydon Airport to Brussels.
 29 July – Alfred Loewenstein's corpse washes ashore at Boulogne-sur-Mer
 5 to 12 August – Socialist International meets in Brussels.
 6 October – New sluices in Nieuwpoort breached by high water.

Art and architecture
Buildings
 Alphonse Pauwels' art deco Cinema Roma opens in Borgerhout

Films
 Rigo Arnould's L'Yser premières in Brussels on 24 September

Artworks
 René Magritte “Les Amants”

Births
 13 May – Eugène Van Roosbroeck, racing cyclist (died 2018)
 11 June – Queen Fabiola of Belgium, in Spain (died 2014)
 16 June – Annie Cordy, performer (died 2020)
 27 June – Antoinette Spaak, politician (died 2020)
 10 July – Herman Van der Wee, economic historian
 26 September – Bob Van der Veken, actor (died 2019)
 9 December – André Milhoux, racing driver
 19 December – Annette Wademant, screenwriter (died 2017)

Deaths
 17 January – Karl Hanquet, historian, 57
 18 March – Paul van Ostaijen, poet, 32
 4 July – Alfred Loewenstein, financier, 51

References

 
1920s in Belgium
Belgium
Years of the 20th century in Belgium
Belgium